Elfström is a Swedish surname. Notable people with the surname include:

 John Elfström (1902–1981), Swedish actor
 Mattias Elfström (born 1997), Swedish ice hockey player
 Sten Elfström (born 1942), Swedish actor

Swedish-language surnames